The Arthur M. Parker House (also known as the Parker House) is a historic house located at 8115 East Jefferson Avenue in Detroit, Michigan, directly adjacent to the Frederick K. Stearns House. It was listed on the National Register of Historic Places on October 9, 1985.

Description
The Arthur M. Parker House is a two-and-one-half-story building, faced with brick on the first story and stucco and half-timbering above. The house has a medieval character reinforced by irregular bays, though more restrained than the next-door Frederick K. Stearns House.The Arthur M. Parker House is significant for its neo-medieval design.

History
The Arthur M. Parker House was  built in 1901. The house was designed for Arthur M. Parker, secretary-treasurer of the Detroit Boiler Company, by the Detroit firm of Malcomson & Higginbotham. By the 1980s, the house was being used by the Detroit School Board. By the 2000s, the house is used as the headquarters of the Southeast Michigan Synod - Evangelical Lutheran Church in America.

References

External links
Southeast Michigan Synod - Evangelical Lutheran Church in America

Houses in Detroit
Houses on the National Register of Historic Places in Michigan
Houses completed in 1901
National Register of Historic Places in Detroit
Tudor Revival architecture in Michigan